Amity Gardens is a census-designated place (CDP) in Amity Township, Berks County, Pennsylvania. As of the 2010 census, the CDP had a total population of 3,402. The town lends its name to a Fountains of Wayne song.

Geography
Amity Gardens is located at  (40.270155, -75.734834). 

Etymology

Derivation of the name "Amity"

In the "History of Montgomery County", the author records 
the settlement of some Swedes at Douglassville a few 
years after 1699 and the connection of this settlement with 
a group of Germans at New Hanover. A road was laid out 
from New Hanover to Germantown. Along these roads, the 
word "Amity" was used to designate a locality. 
The name was adopted by the inhabitants of the area to 
symbolize their relations with the Indians. Although 
Sweden lost the colony in 1638, the Swedish settlers sent 
a letter to their homeland in 1693 asking for ministers and 
religious books. In this letter they stated, "We live in great 
amity with the Indians, who have not done us harm for 
many years." From this incident, those Swedish settlers 
who migrated up the Schuylkill beyond the Manatawny 
called their settlement, Amity.

Demographics

At the 2000 census, there were 3,370 people, 1,243 households, and 948 families living in the CDP. The population density was 3,543.8 people per square mile (1,369.6/km). There were 1,269 housing units at an average density of 1,334.4/sq mi (515.8/km).  The racial makeup of the CDP was 95.01% White, 2.58% African American, 0.06% Native American, 0.83% Asian, 0.03% Pacific Islander, 0.27% from other races, and 1.22% from two or more races. Hispanic or Latino of any race were 1.31%.

There were 1,243 households, 36.8% had children under the age of 18 living with them, 65.4% were married couples living together, 8.0% had a female householder with no husband present, and 23.7% were non-families. 18.7% of households were made up of individuals, and 8.0% were one person aged 65 or older. The average household size was 2.71 and the average family size was 3.12.

The age distribution was 27.1% under the age of 18, 6.6% from 18 to 24, 30.2% from 25 to 44, 25.9% from 45 to 64, and 10.2% 65 or older. The median age was 37 years. For every 100 females, there were 97.0 males. For every 100 females age 18 and over, there were 92.0 males.

The median household income was $60,586 and the median family income  was $70,250. Males had a median income of $48,000 versus $32,234 for females. The per capita income for the CDP was $27,614. About 2.1% of families and 3.8% of the population were below the poverty line, including 1.6% of those under age 18 and 12.8% of those age 65 or over.

References

Census-designated places in Berks County, Pennsylvania
Census-designated places in Pennsylvania